Peter Jeffrey Marshall (born March 9, 1982) is an American competition swimmer who specializes in the backstroke.  He is a former world record holder in the 50-meter backstroke (short course) and the 100-meter backstroke (short course).

He has won a total of fourteen medals in major international competition—ten gold, two silver, and two bronze—spanning the World Championships, Pan American Games, and Pan Pacific Championships.

Career
Over his career Peter Marshall has broken eight world records (4×100-meter medley relay 2002, 100-meter backstroke 2004, 100-meter backstroke 2008, 50-meter backstroke 2008, 100-meter backstroke 2008, 50-meter backstroke 2009, 50-meter backstroke 2009, 50-meter backstroke 2009) and won two world titles (4×100-meter medley relay scm 2002, and 50 Backstroke scm 2008). He currently holds the US Open record and NCAA record in the 100-meter backstroke (short course meters), and was a part of the American team that set the world record in the 4×100-meter medley relay (now surpassed). He is a two-time National A team member (2001, 2004), a three-time National B team member (2002, 2005, 2006) and a six-time NCAA All-American.  He earned his first national championship in the 100-meter backstroke in the summer of 2001 in Clovis, California. While at Stanford University, he won three consecutive Individual NCAA Titles in the 100-meter backstroke. In 2004 he was named Pac-10 Swimmer of the Year for his first individual world record set at the NCAA Championships in Long Island, New York.

He was a member of the 2001 World University Games team, the 2002 Pan Pacific Swimming Championships, the 2002 Short Course World Championships, the 2003 Pan American Games, the 2004 Short Course World Championships, 2006 Pan Pacific Swimming Championships, 2007 Pan American Games, and the 2008 Short Course World Championships.

Marshall began his swimming career at the Dynamo Swim Club, one of the premier swim groups in America. He is a graduate of Marist School in Atlanta, Georgia (2000) and Stanford University (2004). He has one older sister (Heather) and two younger brothers (John and Gary). His cousin, Gary Marshall, also swam for Stanford after transferring from the University of Virginia.

See also

 List of Stanford University people
 Pan American Games records in swimming
 World record progression 50 metres backstroke
 World record progression 100 metres backstroke
 World record progression 4 × 100 metres medley relay

References

External links
 
 
 

1982 births
Living people
American male backstroke swimmers
American male freestyle swimmers
Swimmers from Atlanta
Stanford Cardinal men's swimmers
Swimmers at the 2003 Pan American Games
Swimmers at the 2007 Pan American Games
World record setters in swimming
Medalists at the FINA World Swimming Championships (25 m)
Pan American Games gold medalists for the United States
Pan American Games medalists in swimming
Universiade medalists in swimming
Universiade gold medalists for the United States
Medalists at the 2001 Summer Universiade
Medalists at the 2003 Pan American Games
Medalists at the 2007 Pan American Games
20th-century American people
21st-century American people